Tour de France à la voile is an annual yachting race around the coast of France. Inaugurated in 1978, it links the English Channel to the French Riviera and is held in July.

Famous skippers have taken part in the race, including Loïck Peyron and the four time America's Cup winner Russell Coutts. The race is, however, not reserved for professionals, and it also attracts amateurs and students thanks to three distinct rankings.

The race visits around ten harbours along the French coast. It includes one or two day coastal stages - that vary from year to year - as well as intensive regattas at the various ports. The boats are transported by road (trucks) midway through the race from stages held in the Atlantic Ocean to those in the Mediterranean Sea.

Classes used

Each team sails the same type of boat, so that it is a one design competition. Different boats have been used since the creation of the race, as has the balance of the offshore and inshore racing elements. Classes used have been:

List of previous winners

External links
Official website